Alda is both a surname and a given name. Notable people with the name include:

Surname
Alan Alda (born 1936), American actor, best known for his portrayal of Hawkeye Pierce in TV show M*A*S*H 
Antony Alda (1956–2009), American actor, son of Robert Alda, half brother of Alan Alda
Arlene Alda, photographer, musician, author; wife of Alan Alda
Beatrice Alda (born 1961), American actress, daughter of Alan and Arlene
Dada Gallotti (born 1935), Italian actress born Alda Gallotti
Elizabeth Alda (born 1960), American actress, daughter of Alan and Arlene
Frances Alda (1879–1952), New Zealand-born, Australian-raised operatic soprano
Julio Ruiz de Alda (1897–1936), Spanish aviator and politician
Robert Alda (1914–1986), American actor, singer and dancer, father of Alan and Antony Alda 
Rutanya Alda (born 1942), Latvian-American actress

Given name
Alda of Alania, 11th-century Alan princess
Aldobrandesca (or Saint Alda) (c. 1249–c. 1309), Italian Christian saint and nurse
Alda Bandeira (born 1949), politician from São Tomé and Príncipe
Alda Facio (born 1948), Costa Rican jurist, writer and teacher 
Alda Garrido (1896–1970), Brazilian vaudeville actress
Alda Lara (1930–1962), Portuguese writer
Alda Lazo (born 1949), Peruvian politician
Alda Merini (1931–2009), Italian writer
Alda Neves da Graça do Espírito Santo (1926–2010), poet and government minister from São Tomé and Príncipe
Alda Noni (1916–2011), Italian soprano
Alda Ólafsdóttir (born 1966), Icelandic singer known simply as Alda
Alda Wilson (1910–1996), Canadian sprinter

Feminine given names